To skydive is to jump from an aircraft with a parachute, as a sport.

Skydive may also refer to:

"Skydive" (song), 2014 single by Chuckie featuring Maiday 
Skydive (Transformers), a fictional character from the Transformers series
Skydive (G.I. Joe), a fictional character in the G.I. Joe universe
Skydive!, a 1996 young-adults novel by Gary Paulsen
Skydive! Go Ahead and Jump, a 1999 video game developed by The Groove Alliance and Gonzo Games and published by Electronic Arts
Skydive Houston Airport, Waller County, Texas, USA

See also

 Spacedive
 
 Skydiver (disambiguation)
 Diver (disambiguation)
 Sky (disambiguation)